Helluoherpia is a genus of pholidoskepian solenogasters, shell-less, worm-like marine mollusks. It's 3–6 mm long and 200–300 µm wide.

References

Pholidoskepia